Jacques Teugels (Ixelles, 3 August 1946) is a retired Belgian footballer.

During his career, he played at the club level for R.W.D. Molenbeek. Teugels also earned 13 caps for the Belgium national football team, and participated in UEFA Euro 1972.

Honours

Player 
RSC Anderlecht

 Belgian First Division: 1966–67, 1967–68
 Toulon Tournament: 1967

RWD Molenbeek 

 Belgian First Division: 1974–75
 Jules Pappaert Cup: 1975
 Amsterdam Tournament: 1975

International 

 UEFA European Championship:Third place: 1972

References
 Royal Belgian Football Association: Number of caps
 

1946 births
Living people
Belgian footballers
Belgium international footballers
UEFA Euro 1972 players
R.W.D. Molenbeek players
Association football forwards